Justice Devendra Kachhawaha (born 3 May 1960) is an Indian judge. He was the judge of the Rajasthan High Court till his superannuation in 2022. Presently, the Government of State of Rajasthan has appointed him as Chairman of State Consumer Disputes Redressal Commission for the State of Rajasthan. Earlier he has served as a District and Session Judge of various District and Session courts in Rajasthan. An order elevating 6 judicial officers as Judge of Rajasthan High Court was issued on 4 March 2020 in this regard. All the six judges so elevated were sworn in by Chief Justice Indrajit Mahanty in a simple ceremony held on 6 March 2020.

References 

Indian judges
Living people
1960 births
Judges of the Rajasthan High Court